''Faactory'' is an Indian  Love Thriller Drama film released in 03 Sep 2021 directed by Faisal Khan.

This is Faissal Khan's comeback film.

Cast 
 
Faisal Khan as Yash Kadam
Roaleey Ryan as Natasha
Rajkumar Kanojia as Tommy

Release 
Faactory was released on 03 Sep 2021 India.

Critical reception
Faactory was poorly received by critics and audiences reason of the actors poor performance.

References

External links 
 Faactory at the Internet Movie Database (IMDb)
 Box office India
 Filmibeat
 Bollywood hungama

2021 films
2020s Hindi-language films
Indian thriller drama films